The 2007 Richmond Spiders football team represented the University of Richmond during the 2007 NCAA Division I FCS football season. Richmond competed as a member of the Colonial Athletic Association (CAA) and played their home games at the University of Richmond Stadium.

The Spiders were led by fourth-year head coach Dave Clawson. Richmond finished the regular season with a 9–2 overall record and 7–1 record in conference play, sharing the CAA title with the University of Massachusetts Amherst. With Massachusetts having won the CAA's automatic berth to the FCS playoffs on a coin flip, the Spiders were awarded an at-large playoff berth.  At home they defeated , and then on the road, Richmond beat Wofford. In the semifinals, Richmond fell on the road to eventual national champion Appalachian State.

Schedule

References

Richmond
Richmond Spiders football seasons
Colonial Athletic Association football champion seasons
Richmond Spiders football